Khawaja is an honorific title used across the Middle East, South Asia, Southeast Asia and Central Asia.

Khawaja may also refer to:

Given name
Khawaja Akmal, Pakistani television actor and comedian
Khawaja Muhammad Asif (born 1949), Pakistani politician
Khawaja Nazimuddin (1894–1964), Bengali politician
Khawaja Pervez (1932–2011), Pakistani film composer, lyricist and film songwriter

Middle name
Hina Khawaja Bayat, Pakistani actress

Surname
Allah Dino Khawaja, a.k.a. A.D. Khawaja, Pakistani police officer 
Ataf Khawaja, Danish rap artist, of Pakistani origin
Faizan Khawaja (born 1986), Pakistani American actor and producer
Khalid Khawaja (1951–2010), Pakistani Air Force officer
Momin Khawaja (born 1979), Canadian found guilty of involvement in a bombing plot
Usman Khawaja (born 1986), Australian cricketer

Other uses
Khawaja and Son, a Pakistani TV comedy serial

See also
 Khoja (disambiguation)
 Hoca, Turkish transliteration of Khawaja
 Hoxha (surname), Albanian surname, transliteration of Khawaja